Roxwell is a village and civil parish in the Chelmsford district of Essex, England. Further Roxwell hamlets are Peppers Green at the north of the parish and Radley Green at the south.

The village 

The Anglican parish church of St Michael and All Angels dates from the 14th century and is a Grade II* listed building. There is a primary school called Roxwell Church of England Voluntary Controlled Primary School which is linked to the local Anglican parish church, the Chequers public house, and a village store and post office.

Newland Hall, an Elizabethan manor house on Bishop Stortford Road, was built by the Newland family, descendants of the 13th century lord of the manor Ralph de Neweland. At the time of the Domesday Book, the land was owned by Eustace, Earl of Boulogne. The Hall is now used as a wedding venue.

History 

In 1870-72, Roxwell was described as:   "a parish, with a village, in Chelmsford district, Essex; on the river Chelmer, 4½ miles W by N of Chelmsford r. station."In 1894, the village had a parish council consisting of 7 members and a chairman. Also, at this time the village had a manor house called Dukes Manor which belonged to Lord Petre.

Demographics

Population 
According to the 2011 census, Roxwell had a population of 1,044, and 23.2% of this population are between 45 and 59 years old. The ethnic make up of the area is predominantly white, making up 93.9% of the population in this area (English, Welsh, Scottish or Northern Irish). The rest of the population is made up of White Irish, White Gypsy or Irish Traveller, White Other, Mixed Ethnic Group - White and Asian, Mixed Ethnic Group - Other, Asian/Asian British- Indian, Asian/Asian British - Pakistani, Asian/Asian British - Other Asian, Black/African/Caribbean/Black British - African, Other Ethnic Group - Arab, and Other Ethnic Group - Any Other Ethnic Group.

Overall, Roxwell's population has grown over the last 200 years. From 1800, population was gradually increasing. For 50 years it increased with few fluctuations, but then started to decrease. Eventually population was back at the same level as it was in 1800 of around 650 people in this area. However, after this point, population slowly started to increase and then following the end of the Second World War in 1946 there was a baby boom. This meant that population reached its peak around 1960 at just over 1200 people, but then declined rapidly. However, looking at the data from all previous census' dating back to 1800, and specifically at the 2011 census, it is continuing to grow at a steady rate to just over 1000 people.

Occupations and health 
Information from occupational structure graphs shows a clear change in type of employment since the late 19th century. In 1881 agriculture was the dominant occupation whereas in 2011 many more residents worked in professional occupations. There is a clear change in the occupational structure for men who have shifted from Agricultural occupations to occupations involved in Construction. Nowadays, few women work in the Domestic Offices or Services, whilst the majority of women work in Social Services such as in Human Health or Education. This changing pattern of occupation fits in with the overall national trends, where 12% of those in England and Wales work in Skilled Trades Occupations.

Results from the 2011 census show that 46.8% of Roxwell's population were of very good health and only 0.4% of the total population were of very poor health. The statistic regarding if day-to-day activities are limited also supports the overall good health of the population of Roxwell. This is because 877 of the 1044 population were not limited in day-to-day life, as of 2011. Overall, the village occupants are of good health and do not majorly rely upon their local healthcare.

References

External links 

Villages in Essex
Civil parishes in Essex